Conasprella ogum is a species of sea snail, a marine gastropod mollusc in the family Conidae, the cone snails, cone shells or cones.

Distribution
This species occurs in the Caribbean Sea
and as far South as Itaparica Island, Bahia, Brazil.

References

 Petuch E.J. & Myers R.F. (2014) New species of Conidae and Conilithidae (Gastropoda: Conoidea) from the Bahamas, eastern Caribbean, and Brazil. Xenophora Taxonomy 3: 26-46.
  Puillandre N., Duda T.F., Meyer C., Olivera B.M. & Bouchet P. (2015). One, four or 100 genera? A new classification of the cone snails. Journal of Molluscan Studies. 81: 1-23

External links
 To World Register of Marine Species
 

ogum
Gastropods described in 2014